Ubiquitin specific peptidase 10, also known as USP10, is an enzyme which in humans is encoded by the USP10 gene.

Function 

Ubiquitin is a highly conserved protein that is covalently linked to other proteins to regulate their function and degradation. This gene encodes a member of the ubiquitin-specific protease family of cysteine proteases. The enzyme specifically cleaves ubiquitin from ubiquitin-conjugated protein substrates. The protein is found in the nucleus and cytoplasm. It functions as a co-factor of the DNA-bound androgen receptor complex, and is inhibited by a protein in the Ras-GTPase pathway. The human genome contains several pseudogenes similar to this gene.

Interactions 

USP10 has been shown to interact with G3BP1.
In the endothelium, USP10 regulates Notch signaling by slowing down the degradation of the intracellular domain of NOTCH1.

References

Further reading